Burgen may refer to:

Burgen, Bernkastel-Wittlich, municipality in Rhineland-Palatinate, Germany
Burgen, Mayen-Koblenz, municipality in Rhineland-Palatinate, Germany

People with the surname
Arnold Burgen (1922–2022), British scientist
Jim Burgen, American pastor